The Stade des Ponts Jumeaux (the "Twin Bridges Stadium") was a rugby union stadium, inaugurated on 24 November 1907, in the Ponts Jumeaux district of Toulouse, south-western France. The land was purchased by the embryonic Stade Toulousain rugby team – with financial assistance from city notables – then headed by a law professor from the University of Toulouse, Ernest Wallon. The stadium, nicknamed Le Wallon, had a capacity of 6500 and hosted many internationals during its existence. In the early 1980s, the land on which the stadium stood was compulsorily purchased to make way for the Toulouse ringroad and the Stade Toulousain moved from the Ponts Jumeaux to a new stadium at Sept-Deniers, later renamed Stade Ernest-Wallon. One of the pavilions at Stade Ernest-Wallon is named after the Ponts Jumeaux.

Notes and references

Stade Toulousain
Rugby union stadiums in France
Sports venues in Toulouse
Sports venues completed in 1907
Sports venues demolished in 1980
1907 establishments in France
Defunct sports venues in France
Demolished buildings and structures in France